{{Speciesbox
|image=Starr 070215-4478 Falcataria moluccana.jpg
|image_caption=Specimen at Waiehu, Maui
|genus=Falcataria
|species=falcata
|authority=(L.) Greuter & R.Rankin
|synonyms_ref=
|synonyms=
Adenanthera falcata 
Adenanthera falcataria 
Albizia eymae 
Albizia falcata 
Albizia falcataria 
Albizia fulva 
Albizia moluccana 
Falcataria moluccana 
Paraserianthes falcataria 
Paraserianthes falcataria subsp. fulva 
Paraserianthes falcataria subsp. solomonensis 
Pithecellobium falcatum 
Paraserianthes falcatoria {{small|(L.) I.C.Nielsen (Spelling variant)}}
}}Falcataria falcata (syns. Albizia falcata, Falcataria moluccana and Paraserianthes falcataria), commonly known as the Moluccan albizia, is a species of fast-growing tree in the family Fabaceae. It is native to the Maluku Islands, New Guinea, the Bismarck Archipelago, and the Solomon Islands. It is cultivated for timber throughout South Asian and Southeast Asian countries. This tree is considered to be invasive in Hawaii, American Samoa and several other island nations in the Pacific and Indian Oceans.

Common namesFalcataria falcata is cultivated throughout the wet tropical and subtropical regions of the world and so has many common names. These include: albizia (Hawaii), Moluccan albizia, sengon (Java), salawaku (Maluku), jeungjing (Indonesia), ai-samtuco (Tetun, Timor-Leste), batai (Malaysia), kerosin tree (Pohnpei), sau, Moluccan sau, and falcata (Philippines), Tamaligi (Samoa).

Description
Leaves – twice pinnately compound with small leaflets
Flowers – creamy white small flowers are faintly fragrant
Fruits – pods that fall from the trees when mature.
Bark – smooth, light or white colored bark.
Wood – light tan with long fibers.
Wood density=280 kg / cubic meter (based on weight and volume at 18% moisture content)
Chromosome number 2n=26.

The tree has become invasive in forests in Hawaii and on other Pacific islands, like New Caledonia.

Uses
Commercial uses – Falcataria falcata softwood is used to make match-sticks, chopsticks, shipping pallets, and wooden boxes. The pulp is used for paper-making. Plywood production and veneer based products have increasingly been an important use for these trees.
Traditional uses – Whole tree trunks are carved for seagoing canoes. Also used extensively for firewood in Timor-Leste and elsewhere.
Agroforestry – Grown as a coffee shade tree. Inter-cropped with Eucalyptus to add nitrogen. Used for agroforestry with pineapple and other crops in Indonesia and Timor-Leste.

Insects found on Falcataria falcata
In Hawaii the caterpillars of the endemic Hawaiian koa looper (Scotorythra paludicola) has been found to defoliate Falcataria falcata and complete their development on this invasive tree without the larvae eating the leaves of their native host Acacia koa.

In Borneo the following moth species have been identified as feeding on Falcataria falcata.Lymantria brunneiplaga – Family LymantriidaeHypochrosis cryptopyrrhata – Family GeometridaeErygia spissa – Family ErebidaeHypopyra pudens – Family Erebidae

In the broader Indomalayan region the following species have also been found feeding on F. falcata:Charaxes bernardus – Lepidoptera: Family NymphalidaeEurema blanda and Eurema hecabe – Lepidoptera: Family Pieridae. Caterpillars of these two species are pests of young trees and seedlings (respectively).Xystrocera festiva – Coleoptera: Family Cerambycidae. Large groups of larvae feed under the bark can cause tree death in plantation forestry.

The industrial tree plantation wood Falcataria falcata was found to be susceptible to the species of drywood termites, Cryptotermes cynocephalus, in trials in the Philippines. This tree species has also been found to be susceptible to the subterranean termite species Coptotermes formosanus in tests conducted in Indonesia and Hawaii. The Formosan subterranean termites consumed 49 ± 4.0 µg/termite/day of F. falcata wood in the Indonesian Standard (SNI) laboratory tests or 66 ± 6.5 µg/termite/day under the Japanese Standard (JIS) tests for termite susceptibility.

DiseasesFalcataria falcata is the primary host of the gall rust fungus Uromycladium falcatarium, and has also been recorded as a host of Uromycladium tepperianum. Both of these gall rust species cause severe damage throughout all stages of the tree's growth.

Two Actinomycetales bacteria Streptomyces asiaticus and S. cangkringensis have been isolated from the rhizosphere soil surrounding F. falcata in Indonesia. Although at least 10 species of Streptomyces'' are plant pathogens it is unclear if these two species have any negative impacts on the roots or other tissues of this tree.

Gallery

References

External links

Mimosoids
Flora of the Maluku Islands
Flora of Papuasia
Flora of the Santa Cruz Islands
Plants described in 2016